Patricia Huston (August 10, 1929 – September 25, 1995) was an American stage, film, and television actress. She had an explosive early career from 1958 to 1968, went through a twenty-year period with no acting work, and resumed her career with several recurring roles on popular shows during the last ten years of her life.

Early life
She was born Patricia Lou Baker in Mount Vernon, New York. Her parents were Charles G. Baker and Margie A Winingar. Very little is known of her family and childhood. According to a blind newspaper item from 1963 she had two sisters. She obtained her first social security card in November 1943 under the name Pat Lou Baker; from the number assigned it appears she was living in Illinois at the time. According to later interviews, she grew up in Chicago where she acted in school plays, attended Northwestern University for a year, then studied dramatics and graduated cum laude from the University of Arizona with a Fine Arts degree. In June 1956 the name on her Social Security Administration file changed to "Pat Baker Huston".

First decade: 1958–1968

Fast start
The earliest records of her as a professional actress come from Los Angeles during spring 1958, when she was already 27. She played in a stage version of Inherit the Wind, made her first film, The Bonnie Parker Story for AIP, and did her first television work, two episodes of Studio One, all within a three month span.

By the end of 1958, she had completed filming on Paratroop Command, her second movie for director William Witney and AIP; done two more television episodes; had attracted the attention of Lucille Ball who signed her to a contract with Desilu Productions; and was in the midst of a highly successful six week run for the play Children of Darkness. It was an unusual and auspicious first year for a neophyte performer.

Desilu workshop
Columnists noted that Lucille Ball was prominently in attendance at the opening nights of Huston's early plays. Her "Little Red Schoolhouse" at the Desilu Workshop was training eight contract players including Huston in the finer points of stagecraft and television work. Desilu's patronage was also responsible for Huston obtaining so many television roles in her first years of performing.

Huston continued her streak of near simultaneous stage and television work into 1959. She had several television shows broadcast before unexpectedly taking on another stage role in Compulsion, when the original actress dropped out during dress rehearsals. The play ran for two months, after which Huston made some more television episodes before heading down to the La Jolla Playhouse for some summer stock.

She co-starred with Barry Sullivan in the two-person play, Two for the Seesaw, which was still in its original run on Broadway. The performance drew raves for Huston and led to a nationally syndicated newspaper interview of her by columnist Donald Freeman. She finished 1959 with more television, for a total of ten shows including such ratings heavyweights as Perry Mason, Gunsmoke, M Squad, and Wagon Train.

Stumbles
She hit some minor career stumbles during spring 1960. First up was an original play, Music in the Distance, by drama critic Patterson Greene, performed at the Circle Theater in Hollywood during February 1960. Huston, William Phipps, Kathie Browne, and Mark Herron went through a comedy of couples to a lukewarm reception by reviewers. The play folded early, and Huston was soon plunged into another lost cause.

Desilu and CBS had a close working relationship, which accounted for the majority of Huston's television work thru 1960 being on that network. CBS had a taped daily afternoon soap opera called For Better Or Worse, which needed a new face for an upcoming storyline. The show was formatted with a changing cast and storyline each month, was doing poorly in ratings, and would itself be replaced in late June by Full Circle. So Huston was committed to a daily grind that lasted five weeks in an obscure failing show.

Huston hoped to regain some career momentum by agreeing to reprise her success in Two for the Seesaw with Hugh O'Brien for a five week tour. O'Brien had just finished filming his last episodes of The Life and Legend of Wyatt Earp and was immensely popular. However, he appeared lost and awkward in the center staged first engagement at the Highland Park Tent Theater, for which the Chicago Tribune critic blamed Huston "playing the extroverted floozy with all the pseudo-Bancroft stops out". O'Brien did better at the more traditional Drury Lane Theatre in the second two week engagement, and the actors finished their tour back on the West Coast at the Lobero Theatre. To counter the negative review from Chicago, they took out trade paper ads listing their good reviews, illustrated with cartoons drawn by Huston of them on a seesaw.

Post Desilu
A last spate of Desilu arranged television shows filled Huston's 1960 schedule. Come 1961, she was an independent talent, represented by the Sanford Camora Agency. Her television appearances were halved from her Desilu tenure due to an extended stage commitment, and the shows themselves were mainly short-lived sitcoms or syndicated programs. She was also cast in a campy women's prison film for Warner Brothers originally titled Ladies of the Mob, but which was released in 1962 as House of Women.

Her main professional satisfactions that year came from the stage. She was nominated for the Sarah Siddons Award for Two for the Seesaw, but lost to Gertrude Berg. She was prominent in the West Coast premiere of The Balcony at the LA Civic Playhouse. The production starred Maxine Stuart, Adam Williams, and Huston, with Josip Elic, Arthur Malet, Tom Costello, and Derva Korwin in feature roles. Huston's performance as the call girl Carmen drew high praise from the LA critics, with the production running for four months.

Columnist Mike Connolly suggested that Huston had lost the lead in a new TV series because her agent Sandy Camora had asked for too much money.  Soon after, Huston switched her representation to General Artists Corporation.

January 1962 saw Huston receive top billing for an English language revival of The Dybbuk at the Pasadena Playhouse. She played the central role of "Leah", with the other leads being Richard Hale, John D. Brinkley, and Michael Fox. Her reviews were good, the play ran three weeks, but the main impact of it was on her personal life.

Receding tide
From 1962 on the number of performing jobs Huston undertook declined. Her television work lessened each year until late 1965, when she snagged a recurring role on the new soap opera Days of Our Lives. She originated the role of Addie Olson, the mother of rebellious teenager Julie Olson played by Charla Doherty. She had a small part in the film Synanon (1965), her last for thirty years.

Her first stage work in three years (and her last for the next twenty) took place during August 1965, in San Francisco with a LeRoi Jones play, Dutchman. The  play starred Paul Winfield and Huston (replacing Sheree North from the Los Angeles run), with Burgess Meredith directing. It was presented on a double bill with The Toilet, a shorter drama with a different cast. Both plays were held over for a total of five weeks.

Hiatus: 1969–1984
There is very little information about this period in Huston's life, except from an interview given after her career revived in the mid-1980s. Her principal occupation was raising her son, but she also worked some part-time jobs, and at one point even went on welfare. A program for welfare recipients landed her a job answering phones for an institution, and she eventually worked herself into administration there.

Second decade: 1985–1995
According to Huston, her career stage revival occurred when her mother came out to Los Angeles from Chicago for a visit. Director Edward Ludlum ran into her and asked how Huston was doing. He persuaded Huston to visit a theater class he was leading then gradually involved her in teaching, directing, and performing in local stage productions.

However, even before this Huston had appeared in brief roles for two television shows, Cheers and Gimme a Break! in early 1985. And during 1986 she had recurring roles in three different TV series:  "Sarah" on General Hospital, "Hilda Brauchwager" on L.A. Law, and "Helga" on Days of Our Lives. The first two of these roles would carry into later seasons, while in 1989 she would be re-cast as a third recurring character on Days of Our Lives. Besides these recurring roles, Huston also appeared in single episodes of seven other TV series and two Made for TV movies before her career wound up.

Huston died on September 25, 1995 in San Pedro, California; she was cremated and her ashes deposited at sea. Her last performance, a minor bit as a nun for the film Heaven's Prisoners, was released nine months later.

Personal life
As a young actress, Huston identified as "beat", wrote poetry, played the bongos, had an all purple bathroom, and referred to herself as a "serious kook". She was slow to realize her growing fame; when her pet schnauzer went astray, she took out a "Lost" ad in a Hollywood area newspaper using her own name and phone number.

Before her marriage, gossip columns linked her most closely with another ex-Chicagoan, John Vivyan. The couple, both Democrats, performed at a fundraising rally of "Citizens for Kennedy" in September 1960. An item for two years, they made an unusual couple, the college honors graduate and the blue-collar guy with only one year of high school.

At first rehearsal for The Dybbuk in January 1962, Huston met her co-star John D. Brinkley, who was from Chicago and two years younger than she was. They announced their engagement in early February and said they would marry on Valentine's Day of 1962. However, columnist Mike Connolly reported their astrologer advised a later date so they postponed the ceremony until February 23. The couple had one child, a son born in May 1963. They divorced in November 1984.

Stage performances

Filmography

Notes

References

External links 
 

1929 births
1995 deaths
People from Mount Vernon, New York
American television actresses
American stage actresses
American  film actresses
Actresses from New York (state)
University of Arizona alumni
20th-century American actresses